Bennet is the name of a hypermarket / supermarket chain with 71 retail locations in northern Italy.   The business was founded by Enzo Ratti in 1964 at Como and the head office is still located in nearby Montano Lucino.  Most of the commercial outlets are located in Lombardy (39) or Piedmont (26); the rest are in Emilia-Romagna (4), Veneto (1), Friuli-Venezia Giulia (1) and Liguria (1).

External links
 Official website

Retail companies of Italy
Italian brands
Supermarkets of Italy
Retail companies established in 1964